Tell Me I'm Pretty is the fourth studio album by American rock band Cage the Elephant. It was released on December 18, 2015, and was announced online on October 5, 2015. The album was recorded in the spring of 2015 at Easy Eye Sound in Nashville, Tennessee. Vocalist Matt Shultz stated: "With this record, we wanted to be more transparent. We wanted to capture the sentiment of each song, and whatever emotional response it provoked, to be really honest to that."

On October 29, 2015, the band released the first single from the album, "Mess Around", accompanied by a music video which was created using footage from the 1902 film A Trip to the Moon and other films by Georges Méliès. Two other songs, "Trouble" and "Too Late to Say Goodbye", were made available for download before the album's release. The second single "Trouble" was sent to alternative radio on April 26, 2016. The album won the award for Best Rock Album at the 59th Grammy Awards.

Recording
Cage the Elephant recruited Dan Auerbach of The Black Keys to produce Tell Me I'm Pretty, with Matt describing him as "reactive" and keeping the band second-guessing themselves, urging scratch vocals and emphasizing first takes.

Composition
The first single, "Mess Around", was initially criticized by some for sounding too similar to material by the Black Keys; however, after the song "Trouble" was released as a preview in November, vocalist Matt Shultz told Alternative Nation, "...the songs have so much diversity in them that I don’t feel like any song is representative of the entire album, kind of like each sound has its own personality." Matt also said that the band found inspiration in David Bowie for his eclectic and ever-changing style.

Critical reception
Tell Me I'm Pretty received generally favorable reviews from music critics. According to review aggregator Metacritic, the album has an average critic review score of 73/100, based on 16 reviews. Writing for Exclaim!, Daniel Sylvester said that frontman Matthew Shultz "has hit the mark lyrically and vocally here, inviting listeners into the emotionally charged and honest world that Cage the Elephant inhabit."

Tell Me I'm Pretty won Best Rock Album at the 59th Annual Grammy Awards on February 12, 2017.

Track listing

Personnel
Personnel adapted from album liner notes.

Cage the Elephant

 Matt Shultz − lead vocals, acoustic guitar
 Brad Shultz − rhythm guitar
 Daniel Tichenor − bass 
 Jared Champion − drums

Additional musicians

 Dan Auerbach − rhythm guitar, keyboards, backing vocals
 Nick Bockrath − lead guitar, backing vocals
 Matthan Minster − keyboards, backing vocals, percussion

Production

 Dan Auerbach − production, arrangements
 Ira Chernova − photography
 Emily Davis − hand tinting
 Collin Dupuis − engineering
 Tom Elmhirst − mixing
 Meghan Foley − art direction
 Brian Lucey - mastering
 Moses Moreno − styling
 Juliette Buchs Shultz − additional design, additional photography
 Matt Shultz − art direction
 Kane Stewart − senior design graphic artist
 Danny Tomczak - assistant production

Charts

Weekly charts

Year-end charts

References

2015 albums
Cage the Elephant albums
Albums produced by Dan Auerbach
Grammy Award for Best Rock Album